Kostandin Kariqi (born 30 October 1996) is a Greek professional footballer who plays as a centre-back for Super League 2 club Proodeftiki. He has also represented Albania at youth international levels.

Club career

Early career
Kariqi started his youth career at Asteras Magoula. In July 2015 he moved to Trikala.

Trikala
He made his debut with Trikala on 15 January 2017 against Aiginiakos playing the full 90-minutes match in a 2–2 draw.

International career

Albania U19
Kariqi received his first international invitation at the Albania national under-19 football team by coach Foto Strakosha for the friendly match against Italy U-19 on 14 May 2014.

He was called up by coach Altin Lala to participate in the 2015 UEFA European Under-19 Championship qualifying round from 12–17 November 2014. Kariqi played all 3 matches as a starter where two first matches against Denmark and Portugal he completed the full 90-minutes and in the closing match against Wales he was substituted off in the 62nd minute for Paolo Ivani. However Albania U19 lost all 3 matches with total of goals collected 2–7, where all two goals were scored by Esad Morina of FC Schalke 04 youth.

Albania U21
Kariqi received his first call up to Albania national under-21 football team by coach Redi Jupi to participate in the Antalya Cup developed in Antalya, Turkey against Saudi Arabia U23 on 22 January 2016, Bahrain U23 on 24 January, Azerbaijan U21 on 26 January, Kosovo U21 on 28 January and Ukraine U21 on 30 January.

2017 UEFA European Under-21 Championship qualification
After having gathered in several friendly matches, Kariqi received his first competitive call up for the 2017 UEFA European Under-21 Championship qualification match against Greece U21 on 2 September 2016. He played against Greece U21 coming on as a half-time substitute in place of Eros Grezda, following a Red card received by fellow Albania U21s defender Silvester Shkalla. Then, in the closing match of the qualification campaign on 10 October 2016 against Israel U21 he played as a starter and was substituted off at half-time for Enea Mihaj.

Career statistics

Club

References

External links

 Kostandin Kariqi profile at FSHF.org

1996 births
Living people
Albania youth international footballers
Albania under-21 international footballers
Association football central defenders
Football League (Greece) players
Trikala F.C. players
Anagennisi Karditsa F.C. players
Volos N.F.C. players
Greek people of Albanian descent
Footballers from Athens
Greek footballers